The  is a constituency of the House of Councillors in the Diet of Japan (national legislature). It was formed pursuant to a 2015 revision of the Public Officers Election Law from a merger of the Tottori and Shimane at-large districts, the two smallest districts in the country, to address the imbalance in representation between rural and urban voters. The district has 1,068,348 registered voters (as of September 2016) and was contested for the first time at the House of Councillors election that was held on 10 July 2016.

Kazuhiko Aoki of the Liberal Democratic Party was the first councillor elected by the district at the 2016 election. As only half of the house's members are elected at each election, the councillors elected by the Shimane and Tottori districts at the 2013 election will continue to represent their respective prefectures until the next election, due to be held by July 2019. At that time, a second councillor will be elected by the merged district.

Elected Councillors

Election Results
At the July 2016 House of Councillors election, the terms of two Councillors who were elected at the 2010 election were due to expire; Kazuhiko Aoki of the Liberal Democratic Party (LDP) represented Shimane Prefecture while Tottori Prefecture was represented by Kazuyuki Hamada, who was elected in 2010 as an LDP candidate but defected to an opposing party a year later. As the only incumbent LDP member in the new district, Aoki received the party's nomination to contest the newly merged district and also received an endorsement from Komeito, the LDP's junior coalition partner. Hamada, aware of the difficulty he faced in defeating Aoki, resigned from the Party for Japanese Kokoro in April 2016 and joined Initiatives from Osaka the same month, receiving their nomination to contest the election from the national proportional representation block.

In an attempt to defeat the ruling LDP-Komeito coalition, the four main opposition parties (Democratic Party, Japanese Communist Party, Social Democratic Party and People's Life Party) agreed to field a single candidate in each single-seat district, who would run as a nominally independent candidate. In the Tottori-Shimane district, the opposition block endorsed Tottori native , a former director-general of the Consumer Affairs Agency and former mayor of Abiko, Chiba. The third candidate in the election was Shimane native Bunta Kokuryō of the Happiness Realization Party. In the election, Aoki received 62.7% of the vote to comfortably defeat Fukushima, who received 34.7%.

{{Election box begin
|title=2019

References

Districts of the House of Councillors (Japan)